The UCI Track Cycling World Championships – Women's team pursuit is the world championship team pursuit for women held annually at the UCI Track Cycling World Championships. The first competition of this event was at the 2008 championships in Manchester, United Kingdom.

Following its introduction as an elite event Great Britain dominated the event, winning the gold medal on six out of the first eight occasions it was held.  From 2014 onwards, the United States came to prominence, winning four titles, with Australia the winner on three occasions. In 2021, Germany became the fourth different nation to win gold in the event.

Until 2014, the distance raced was 3 kilometres, or twelve laps on a typical indoor velodrome track. in 2014 the event was extended to 4000m, to match the men's event, and the number of riders raised from 3 to 4.

British rider Laura Trott, with 4 gold medals, 4 silver and 1 bronze medals,  is the most successful individual rider in the event's history. Her team mate, Joanna Rowsell and American riders Jennifer Valente and Chloé Dygert have each won the event four times, while Australian Ashlee Ankudinoff has won three gold medals over a span of nine years.

Medalists

Medal table

References

External links
Track Cycling World Championships 2016–1893 bikecult.com
World Championship, Track, Team prusuit, Elite cyclingarchives.com

 
Women's team pursuit
Lists of UCI Track Cycling World Championships medalists